Angelo Avramakis (Greek: Βαγγέλης Αβραμάκης) is a Greek musician and bouzouki player. Born in Serres, Greece, he has spent most of his life in Australia. He is considered the leading bouzouki player in Australia and among the top bouzouki players in the world.

Avramakis began playing drums at the age of 4. He learned the bouzouki at the age of 8 and began studies in music theory and harmony at Melba Conservatorium of Music. He also plays the guitar, keyboards, bass guitar and Greek baglama.

Avramakis has performed and toured with some of Greece's well known artists: Vaso Hatzi, Vasilis Saleas, Tasos Bougas, Lakis Alexandrou, Stamatis Gonidis, Zafeiris Melas, Rita Sakellariou, Doukissa, Tzeni Vanou, Stamatis Kokotas, Antzela Dimitriou, Lefteris Pantazis, Yiannis Katevas, John Tikis, Giannis Vasileiou and Marinella. He has also performed with the very popular and very talented Turkish singer Ibrahim Tatlises when he appeared in Melbourne as a guest at "Nikos Greek Tavern" in the 1990s.

Over the last three decades, Avramakis has appeared in Greek newspapers as well as TV shows such as “Tonight Live with Steve Vizard”. Some of Angelo's original music has been played on radio stations 3XY and FOX FM. Thousands of YouTube and Facebook followers regularly share his music videos online.

Avramakis has released a number of CDs, the most popular being "Terma Oi Thisies" and "New Wave Passion", which contain some of the most beautiful bouzouki pieces ever written.

Angelo's bouzouki playing style is rebetiko, laiko with new ideas. Most noticeably, his playing style is very clean, sweet sounding, pleasant to the ear, accurate and well disciplined. His main influences are Manolis Hiotis (Greek: Μανώλης Χιώτης) and Giorgos Zambetas (Greek: Γιώργος Ζαμπέτας).

Songs 
Below are some of the songs written, co-written, arranged or produced by Avramakis. In brackets are the year of CD release, the composer and the lyricist:

  (2000, Spiros Manissalis, Angelo Avramakis, Anestis Chiaplias)
  (2000, Angelo Avramakis, Dimitris Kavvadas)
  (2000, Anestis Chiaplias)
 Latin 2000 - solo (2000, Angelo Avramakis)
  (2000, Spiros Manissalis, Stavros Kopsaftis)
  - solo (2000, Angelo Avramakis)
  (2000, Anestis Chiaplias, Angelo Avramakis, Stavros Kopsaftis)
  (2000, Anestis Chiaplias)
  (2000, Anestis Chiaplias)
  - solo (2000, Angelo Avramakis)
  (2002, Kostas Kartsakis)
  (2002, Kostas Kartsakis, Angelo Avramakis)
  (2002, Kostas Kartsakis)
  (2002, Kostas Kartsakis)
  (2002, Kostas Kartsakis, Angelo Avramakis)
  (2002, Kostas Kartsakis)
  (2002, Kostas Kartsakis)
  (2002, Kostas Kartsakis)
 New Wave Passion (2007, Angelo Avramakis)
  (2007, traditional)
 Mystique (2007, Angelo Avramakis)
  (2007, Erkin Koray)
 Sunshine Walk (2007, Angelo Avramakis)
  (2007, traditional)
 Oasis (2007, Chris Nicolaidis)
 Latin 2000 - remix (2007, Angelo Avramakis)
  - remix (2007, Angelo Avramakis)
 Konya Dance Mix (2007, traditional)
  - remix (2007, Angelo Avramakis)
 Western Tik (2007, traditional)
 Eastern Kotsari (2007, traditional)
  (2007, Serdar Ortaç)

References

External links
 

Greek bouzouki players